Here It Comes may refer to:

 Here It Comes (Doves EP), and the title song
 Here It Comes (Plug EP), and the title song
 "Here It Comes" (song), a song by Strawbs

See also
 Here It Comes Again (disambiguation)